Al-Maqam Mosque is a historic mosque in the city of Basra, Iraq. It is located in the Al-'Ashara region.

Description
The word in  means "shrine", and it is believed that the site was originally a place of shrine, but the views are divided on who was being commemorated. According to an account by Muhammad Sadiq al-Hakim in his documentation, the shrine dated back to the year 772, and it was established by the descendant of Islamic prophet Muhammad and the eighth Shia imam Ali al-Ridha when he visited Basra from Medina.

The construction of the mosque itself dates back to 1754 by the Ottomans. The building is made of brick and constructed in the older Islamic architectural style. One of the domes is painted in blue, and the verses from the Dhikir al-Hakim inscribed on it. The minaret height reaches . The mosque was renovated in 1922 by the Ministry of Awqaf, during which the inner wall was fixed and the outer wall was added on the outside of the courtyard. Subsequently, the mosque has been directly connected to the Shatt al-Arab. There are two libraries adjacent to the mosque, one on the first floor which stores Quran and books for dawah, and another on the second floor which was newly founded and named as the Library of Imam Ali bin Musa al-Ridha.

See also

 Islam in Iraq
 List of mosques in Iraq

References

18th-century mosques
Ottoman mosques in Iraq